This is a List of Miss Navajo titleholders.

The first Miss Navajo was in 1953.

Past titleholders

References

Sources

External links
Miss Navajo Council, Inc official site

Navajo people
Navajo history
History of women in Arizona
Native American women
Miss Navajo
History of women in New Mexico
Miss Navajo